Kung Fu Jungle, also known as Kung Fu Killer and Last of the Best, is a 2014 Hong Kong-Chinese action thriller film directed by Teddy Chan and starring Donnie Yen, Wang Baoqiang, Charlie Yeung  and Michelle Bai. The film premiered at the 58th BFI London Film Festival on 12 October 2014 and was later released theatrically on 30 October 2014 in Hong Kong and 31 October 2014 in China.

It is being released as Kung Fu Killer in the United Kingdom and United States. Being a critical success, it was nominated for numerous Hong Kong Film awards. On 19 April 2015, Kung Fu Jungle won the Hong Kong Film Award for Best Action Choreography, representing the 4th time Donnie Yen has won this coveted award.

Plot
Hahou Mo, a martial arts expert and police self-defense instructor (Donnie Yen) is incarcerated for involuntary manslaughter during a fight with an opponent. Three years later, a vicious killer (Wang Baoqiang) emerges and starts killing retired martial arts masters that Hahou knows. With his own personal agenda, Hahou reveals he knows the killer's next intended victims and offers to aid Inspector Luk Yuen-Sum (Charlie Young) in capturing the killer with his martial arts skills and knowledge in exchange for his freedom.

Cast
Donnie Yen as Hahou Mo
Wang Baoqiang as Fung Yu-Sau
Charlie Yeung as Luk Yuen-Sum				
Michelle Bai as Sinn Ying
Alex Fong as Chief Inspector Lam
Louis Fan as Hung Yip
Xing Yu as Tam King-Yiu
David Chiang as Master Chan Pak-Kwong
Yu Kang as Wong Chit
Christie Chen as Shum Suet
Deep Ng as Tai Yue
Ji Huanbo as Big Guy
Jessica Wong as Siu Man
German Cheung as Fai

Guest appearances
Steve Chan as Duty Officer A
Wong Wai-fai as Duty Officer B
Bey Logan as K1 Kickboxer
Teddy Chan as T.S.T. District Officer
Chow Suk-wai as Identification Bureau Officer
Andrew Lau as Y.M.T. District Officer
Peter Kam as Superintendent
Kirk Wong as Inmate
Sharon Yeung as Landlady
Mang Hoi as Hunan Gangs Leader
Alex Cheung as News Announcer
Tony Leung Siu-hung as Correctional Officer A
Lee Tat-chiu as Correctional Officer B
Cheang Pou-soi as Prison Governor
Raymond Chow as Food Stalls Diners
Joe Cheung as Film Director
Dion Lam as Coroner
Kinson Tsang as Deputy Commissioner OPS
Susan Chan as Reporter A
Roy Szeto as Reporter B
Derek Kwok as Chan Sir
Yuen Bun as Siu Hok-nin
Bruce Law as Truck Driver
Billy Chan as Inmate
Yan Hua as Correctional Officer C

Release and reception
The first teaser trailer was released on 20 July 2014. The final trailer was released on 4 September 2014, displaying its Hong Kong release date on 30 October 2014. On Rotten Tomatoes, the film has a 71% score based on 17 reviews, with an average rating of  6.7/10.

See also
 List of martial arts films

References

External links
 

2014 films
2014 action thriller films
2010s mystery films
Hong Kong action thriller films
Chinese action thriller films
Hong Kong martial arts films
Chinese martial arts films
Kung fu films
Police detective films
2010s Cantonese-language films
Films directed by Teddy Chan
Films set in Hong Kong
Films shot in Hong Kong
2014 martial arts films
2010s Hong Kong films